The Rare Delight of You is a 2002 album by jazz guitarist John Pizzarelli accompanied by pianist George Shearing and his quintet. Interspersed throughout are some established jazz standards as well as a few traditional pop ballads.

Track listing 
"If Dreams Come True"
"The Lady's In Love with You"
"Everything Happens to Me"
"Lulu's Back In Town"
"Something to Remember You By"
"Lemon Twist"
"Lost April"
"Problem"
"The Rare Delight of You"
"Shine On Your Shoes"
"Indian Summer"
"Be Careful It's My Heart"
"September In the Rain"
"I Predict"
"Lucky to Be Me"

Personnel
John Pizzarellivocals, guitar
George Shearingpiano
Ted Piltzeckervibraphone
Reg Schwagerguitar
Neil Swainsondouble-bass
Dennis Mackreldrums

References

2002 albums
John Pizzarelli albums
George Shearing albums
Collaborative albums